This is a list of Members of Parliament (MPs) elected to the 4th Parliament of the Jatiya Sangsad, the National Parliament of Bangladesh, by Bangladeshi constituencies. The list includes both MPs elected at the 1988 general election, held on 3 March 1988, and nominated women's members for reserved seats and those subsequently elected in by-elections.

Members

Elected members of parliament

References 

Members of the Jatiya Sangsad by term
4th Jatiya Sangsad members
Jatiya Sangsad